Cherry Hill (also Brazils Store) is an unincorporated community in Perry County, Arkansas, United States.

Notes

Unincorporated communities in Perry County, Arkansas
Unincorporated communities in Arkansas